Coro Coro may refer to:

 CoroCoro Comic, a Japanese monthly manga magazine
 Corocoro cubano or corocoro grunt, a fish species in the family Haemulidae
 Coro Coro, Bolivia
 Corocoro United Copper Mines
 Corocoro Island, in the coast border between Venezuela and Guyana
 Karakoa, a kind of ship